Frisbie may refer to:

Surname
 Alvah and Martha Frisbie, Iowa pastor and teacher
 Daniel D. Frisbie, politician
 Robert Dean Frisbie, travel writer

Other
 Frisbie (band)
 Frisbie Island (disambiguation)
 Frisbie Pie Company
 Alvah and Martha Frisbie, (Frisbie School, Des Moines, Iowa)

See also

 Frisbee
 Frisbee (disambiguation)